Bledar is an Albanian masculine given name. People bearing the name include:
Bledar Devolli (born 1978), Albanian footballer
Bledar Hodo (born 1985) Albanian footballer 
Bledar Kola (born 1972), Albanian footballer 
Bledar Mançaku (born 1982), Albanian footballer 
Bledar Marashi (born 1990), Albanian footballer 
Bledar Sejko (born 1972), Albanian guitarist, composer, and singer 
Bledar Sinella (born 1976), Albanian footballer and football club manager
Bledar Vashaku (born 1981), Albanian footballer 

Albanian masculine given names